Corneliu Bogdan (born Grumberg, 1921, Moșoaia, Argeș County - 2 January 1990, Bucharest) was a Romanian diplomat, who was Romania's ambassador to the United States between 1967 and 1976.

In his youth he was one of the leaders of the Romanian National Students' Union.

In 1989 he was a visiting scholar at the Woodrow Wilson International Center for Scholars.

He was a minister of state at the post-revolutionary Minister of Foreign Affairs (28 December 1989 to 2 January 1990).

Corneliu Bogdan was married with Emilia, with whom he had three children: Svetlana, Ileana and Olga.

He died of a stroke, and is buried at the Bellu cemetery in Bucharest.

Books 
Sferele de influență, București, Editura Politică, 1986 (with Eugen Preda)
 Spheres of Influence (cu Eugen Preda), Columbia University Press,  (0-88033-961-6), traducere parțială a cărții în lb. română

References

External links 
 Obituary in The New York Times

1921 births
1990 deaths
Ambassadors of Romania to the United States
Burials at Bellu Cemetery